Beacon 23 is an upcoming science fiction psychological thriller series based on the short story series of the same name created by author Hugh Howey.
Starring Lena Headey and Stephan James, the show is a co-production between Spectrum and Boat Rocker Productions. It is set to premiere on Spectrum Originals in the United States.

Set in the 23rd century, Beacon 23 takes place on a remote "lighthouse" in space.

Cast and characters
Lena Headey as Aster Calyx
Stephan James as Halan Kai Nelson
Marnie McPhail as Kanadey
Daniel Malik as Finch
Cyrus Faird as Tech Wrecker
Hannah Melissa Scott as Teenage Aster
Tara Rosling as Randall
Sydney Ozerov-Meyer as Grisha

Production

Development
Initially development of the series was announced in 2018. In March 2021, Lena Headey was named as the series lead. In September of that same year, Stephan James was named as the co-star of the series Prior to the shows initial broadcast, it was announced that the series would be picked up for a second season.

Filming
Principal photography was initially scheduled to begin in Toronto in 2021. After a series of delays, filming finally began on April 19, 2022. The pilot episode was directed by Daniel Percival.

References

External links
 

American drama television series
American science fiction television series
AMC (TV channel) original programming
Spectrum Originals original programming
Upcoming drama television series
Television series by Boat Rocker Media
Television series based on short fiction
Psychological thriller television series
Serial drama television series